The Wales national badminton team represents Wales in international badminton team competitions. It is controlled by Badminton Wales, the national organisation for badminton in the country. Wales have never participated in the Thomas Cup and the Uber Cup. The team's last appearance in the international stage was at the 2007 Sudirman Cup.

The Welsh team had participated in the 2020 European Men's and Women's Team Badminton Championships but were defeated in the group stage.

Participation in BWF competitions

Sudirman Cup

Participation in Commonwealth Games

List of medalists

Participation in European Team Badminton Championships

Men's Team

Women's Team

Mixed Team

Participation in European Junior Team Badminton Championships
Mixed Team

Current squad 
The following players were selected to represent Wales at the 2020 European Men's and Women's Team Badminton Championships.

Male players
Andrew Oates
Andrew Jones
Nic Strange
Adam Stewart
Mo Tsung Fong
Victor Pang
William Kitching
Scott Oates

Female players
Jordan Hart
Jessica Ding
Learna Herkes
Jasmine Owen
Aimie Whiteman
Saffron Morris
Alice Palmer
Katie Whiteman

References

Badminton
National badminton teams
Badminton in Wales